Charlie Chan and the Curse of the Dragon Queen is a 1981 comedy–mystery film directed by Clive Donner that stars Peter Ustinov, Angie Dickinson and Lee Grant.

Plot
Retired detective Charlie Chan is asked for his help by the San Francisco police to solve a new series of murders. This time his usual sidekick, "Number One Son" Lee Chan, has been replaced by Lee's own son, Lee Chan, Jr.

The prime suspect in the killings is a shadowy lady known as the Dragon Queen, but soon Chan's suspicions fall elsewhere. Among those at risk are Lee's maternal grandmother, Mrs. Lupowitz. Even though Lee Jr. is (as usual) rarely accurate in reading clues, he has the love and full support of his beautiful fiancee Cordelia.

Cast
 Peter Ustinov as Charlie Chan
 Lee Grant as Mrs. Lupowitz
 Angie Dickinson as The Dragon Queen
 Richard Hatch as Lee Chan Jr.
 Brian Keith as Police Chief Baxter
 Roddy McDowall as Gillespie
 Rachel Roberts as Mrs. Dangers
 Michelle Pfeiffer as Cordelia Farenington
 Paul Ryan as Masten
 Johnny Sekka as Stefan

Reception

Critical response
 TV Guide gives Charlie Chan and the Curse of the Dragon Queen 0 out of 5 stars.

Roger Ebert and Gene Siskel loathed the movie, giving it two "no" votes on their public television series Sneak Previews, and later listing it as one of the worst movies of 1981.

Conversely, critic Vincent Canby of The New York Times wrote in his review: "Clive Donner's Charlie Chan and the Curse of the Dragon Queen... is loose-limbed, immensely good-natured entertainment that moves easily between parody and slapstick without ever doing damage to the memories of the character who, in the 1950s and 1960s, gained something of a following as a figure of camp."

Release
Charlie Chan and the Curse of the Dragon Queen was released in theatres on February 13, 1981 by American Cinema Productions.

Home media
The film was released on DVD on September 7, 2004, by Trinity Home Entertainment.

References

External links
 

1981 films
1980s parody films
American parody films
Charlie Chan films
1980s comedy mystery films
1980s English-language films
Films scored by Patrick Williams
Films directed by Clive Donner
Films set in San Francisco
1981 comedy films
1980s American films